Keynsham Town Football Club is a semi-professional football club based in Keynsham, Somerset, England.

History
The club was established in 1895. They joined the East Bristol & District League, winning Division Three in 1898–99 to earn promotion to Division Two. After bring promoted to Division One around the turn of the century, the club were relegated to Division Two during the 1930s, before winning the Division Two title in 1949–50 and earning promotion back to Division One. They won the Somerset Senior Cup in 1951–52, and again in 1957–58. In the late 1950s the club joined the Bristol Premier Combination, before moving up to the Somerset County League in 1967.

In 1973 Keynsham joined the Western League. They finished second-from-bottom of the league in 1975–76 and were relegated to the newly formed Division One. However, the club were Division One champions in 1977–78 and were promoted to the Premier Division. In 1979–80 they won the Somerset Professional Cup, defeating Bath City 1–0 on aggregate in the two-legged final. They were relegated back to Division One at the end of the 1982–83 season. The club remained in Division One until the end of the 1996–97 season when they were promoted to the Premier Division as Division One runners-up. However, they were relegated back to Division One two seasons later.

In 2000–01 Keynsham were Division One runners-up, earning promotion to the Premier Division. The club won the Somerset Senior Cup again in 2002–03, but were relegated back to Division One in 2006–07 after finishing bottom of the Premier Division. In 2018–19 they were Division One champions, securing promotion to the Premier Division.

Ground

The club played at "The Hams" until 1910, when they moved to the Gaston ground. In 1925 they relocated to Park Road, where they remained until a move to Charlton Road in 1930. The club moved to their current Crown Field ground in 1945. A new clubhouse was built in the 1970s, followed by new dressing rooms in 1984; floodlights were erected in 1989.

Honours
Western League
Division One champions 1977–78, 2018–19
Bristol & District League
Division Two champions 1948–49
Division Three champions 1898–99
Somerset Professional Cup
Winners 1979–80
Somerset Senior Cup
Winners 1951–52, 1957–58, 2002–03

Records
Best FA Cup performance: Preliminary round, 1990–91, 1991–92, 1994–95, 2003–04
Best FA Trophy performance: Second qualifying round, 1979–80, 1982–83
Best FA Vase performance: Fifth round, 2003–04

See also
Keynsham Town F.C. players
Keynsham Town L.F.C.

References

External links
Official website

Football clubs in England
Football clubs in Somerset
Association football clubs established in 1895
1895 establishments in England
Keynsham
Bristol and District Football League
Bristol Premier Combination
Somerset County League
Western Football League